Johannes ("Hans") Bernardus Everardus Hoogveld (born May 21, 1947 in Amersfoort, Utrecht) is a former water polo player from The Netherlands, who competed in two consecutive Summer Olympics for his native country, starting in 1968. In Mexico City as well as in Munich he finished in seventh position with the Dutch Men's Water Polo Team.

References
 Dutch Olympic Committee

1947 births
Living people
Dutch male water polo players
Olympic water polo players of the Netherlands
Water polo players at the 1968 Summer Olympics
Water polo players at the 1972 Summer Olympics
Sportspeople from Amersfoort
20th-century Dutch people